QUIN, born Bianca Leonor Quiñones, is an American singer/songwriter/producer born in Los Angeles, Calif.

She is currently signed to Interscope Records/Fantasy Soul.

Early life 
QUIN’s passion for music and performing began as a child as she grew up around her musician father play the conga drums and trumpet, her mother was a dancer and school teacher, and she sang in her church and high school choirs. According to QUIN’s mother, the singer wrote her first song at a very young age after the birth of her sister, Bailey Rose.

She attended school in Pasadena, California. After graduating from Pasadena High School, she moved on to college at Cal State Northridge in California. After a year and a half of studying Psychology, QUIN moved to West Oakland and began focusing on music full time at age 19.

Career 
QUIN dropped her debut EP Galactica in October 2016, which includes a feature from G-Eazy on the song “OVER AGAIN.” She describes the EP as “the first chapter to my Fantasy Soul Universe.” Her song “LIGHTSPEED” was involved in the Visions of Harmony project with Apple Music and NASA, which aspired to educate the public on the Juno spacecraft by combining science and art.

A year later, in September 2017, QUIN released her DREAMGIRL EP, which she called a sequel of her album Galactica which features collaborations with Syd on the song “Sticky Situation," and the artist Buddy on the song “Happened to Happen.” all of which was produced by Kry$shun. The music video for “Sticky Situation” was released in August 2017 by the Bush Renz Agency.

She describes her sound as “fantasy soul” and music that “has the power of versatility” and in 2017, QUIN introduced her label, Fantasy Soul, named after the genre she coined.

In August 2018, she released her song “Remind Me”, described by The FADER as “daydream-inducing antidote for all life's worries.” Later that year, QUIN teamed up with Vans for a campaign highlighting the importance of creativity and personal style.

In June 2019,she signed to Interscope Records and also has her own label Fantasy Soul under Universal Music then released her fourth EP "LUCID" in November and the EP features two collabs with Atlanta rapper 6lack including their latest single Mushroom Chocolate.

She is currently working on her debut album for Interscope and Fantasy Soul Records.

QUIN has opened for Erykah Badu, Gnash JMSN, and performed at THE FADER Fort at SXSW, AFROPUNK and Galore’s Girl Cult Festival.

In December 2021, she was featured in Khalid's mixtape "Scenic Drive(The Tape)," release date 3 December 2021, on the song Brand New.

Discography

References

Living people
Year of birth missing (living people)
Singers from Los Angeles
Pasadena High School (California) alumni
California State University, Northridge alumni
21st-century American women singers
21st-century American singers